Grant Gillespie (born 2 July 1991) is a Scottish professional footballer who plays as a midfielder for Greenock Morton. He has previously played for Hamilton Academical, Dundee United, Raith Rovers, Derry City, Ayr United and Queen's Park.

Career
Gillespie made his senior debut for Hamilton Academical on 15 August 2009, in a Scottish Premier League match against Kilmarnock. In May 2011, he signed a new two-year contract with Hamilton.

In May 2012, Gillespie urged manager Billy Reid to make him a first-team regular for the forthcoming 2012–13 season. In January 2012, after making an "impact" as a substitute in the previous game, Gillespie spoke publicly about his desire to start the team's next match. In February 2013, he commented that he wanted a win in the upcoming derby against Airdrieonians. In April 2013, Gillespie signed a new two-year contract with the club.

In August 2013 Gillespie stated that the team needed to "dig in and grind out results" in the season ahead. In October 2014 he signed a new contract with the club, to last until the summer of 2018. Gillespie left the club in January 2018, and then signed a short-term contract with Dundee United. He was released by the club at the end of his contract in May 2018.

Gillespie signed with League One club Raith Rovers in June 2018.

In July 2019 he signed for Derry City.

In January 2020 he returned to Scotland, signing for Ayr United until the end of their season.

In August 2020 he signed for Queen's Park.

In June 2022 he signed for Greenock Morton.

Career statistics

References

1991 births
Living people
Scottish footballers
Hamilton Academical F.C. players
Dundee United F.C. players
Raith Rovers F.C. players
Scottish Premier League players
Scottish Football League players
Scottish Professional Football League players
Association football midfielders
Footballers from Bellshill
Derry City F.C. players
League of Ireland players
Ayr United F.C. players
Queen's Park F.C. players
Greenock Morton F.C. players